Guillermo Calegari can refer to:

 Guillermo Calegari Sr. (born 1924), Argentine Olympic sailor
 Guillermo Calegari Jr. (born 1951), Argentine Olympic sailor